Frederick Ross "Buddy" Lucas (22 May 1931 – 18 October 2002) was a New Zealand swimmer and surf lifesaver.

Biography
Lucas was born in Auckland in 1931, the son of All Black Fred Lucas.  He was educated at Mt Albert Grammar School, where he excelled at rugby and swimming.

At the 1950 British Empire Games he won a gold medal as part of the men's 880 yards Freestyle Relay and two bronze medals in the 440 and 1650 yards freestyle races.

Lucas won a swimming scholarship to the University of Iowa in 1951, becoming the first New Zealander to win a sports scholarship to the United States.  Lucas travelled to Iowa via the United Kingdom, where he won the 220 yards and 440 yards freestyle events at the British championships. In 1952, despite being rated the second-best swimmer in the British Empire, his nomination for the New Zealand team for the Helsinki Olympics was rejected.

In 1954 at the Vancouver British Empire and Commonwealth Games Lucas won a silver medal as part of the men's 330 yards medley relay.

After his return to New Zealand from Iowa in 1957, Lucas worked in his father's menswear store in Queen Street, Auckland, and later was a sales representative for May & Baker. He was active in surf lifesaving, having joined the Piha Surf Life Saving Club in 1944, and served as the club's president for 16 years. In 1958 he won the men's open individual surf race at the New Zealand national surf lifesaving championships.

Lucas died in Auckland in 2002 after a short illness.

See also
 List of Commonwealth Games medallists in swimming (men)

References

1931 births
2002 deaths
Commonwealth Games gold medallists for New Zealand
Commonwealth Games silver medallists for New Zealand
Commonwealth Games bronze medallists for New Zealand
New Zealand male freestyle swimmers
Swimmers at the 1950 British Empire Games
Swimmers at the 1954 British Empire and Commonwealth Games
Iowa Hawkeyes men's swimmers
New Zealand surf lifesavers
Commonwealth Games medallists in swimming
20th-century New Zealand people
21st-century New Zealand people
Medallists at the 1950 British Empire Games
Medallists at the 1954 British Empire and Commonwealth Games